Nell Morris-Dalton (born 5 April 2001) is an Australian rules footballer who plays for Collingwood in the AFL Women's (AFLW). She previously played four seasons for Western Bulldogs.

AFLW career
Morris-Dalton was drafted by Western Bulldogs with their 6th pick of the 2019 national draft. It was revealed that Morris-Dalton had signed a contract extension with the club on 16 June 2021, after playing 5 games for the club that season.

In March 2023, Morris-Dalton was traded to Collingwood in exchange for pick #15.

Statistics
Statistics are correct to the end of the S7 (2022) season.

|- 
| scope=row | 2020 ||  || 25
| 1 || 0 || 1 || 5 || 3 || 8 || 2 || 5 || 0.0 || 0.0 || 5.0 || 3.0 || 8.0 || 2.0 || 5.0 || 0
|- 
| scope=row | 2021 ||  || 25
| 5 || 1 || 1 || 27 || 8 || 35 || 13 || 10 || 0.2 || 0.2 || 5.4 || 1.6 || 7.0 || 2.6 || 2.0 || 0
|- 
| scope=row | 2022 ||  || 25
| 9 || 7 || 1 || 39 || 30 || 69 || 14 || 25 || 0.8 || 0.1 || 4.3 || 3.3 || 7.7 || 1.6 || 2.8 || 0
|- 
| scope=row | S7 (2022) ||  || 25
| 5 || 0 || 1 || 22 || 14 || 36 || 13 || 7 || 0.0 || 0.2 || 4.4 || 2.8 || 7.2 || 2.6 || 1.4 || 0
|- class=sortbottom
! colspan=3 | Career
! 20 !! 8 !! 4 !! 93 !! 55 !! 148 !! 42 !! 47 !! 0.4 !! 0.2 !! 4.7 !! 2.8 !! 7.4 !! 2.1 !! 2.4 !! 0
|}

References

External links

 

Living people
2001 births
Northern Knights players (NAB League Girls)
Western Bulldogs (AFLW) players
Australian rules footballers from Victoria (Australia)
Sportswomen from Victoria (Australia)